Raytown Senior High School is a high school located in Raytown, Missouri. The school was established in 1914. The enrollment of Raytown High School currently stands at 1503 students. The school, located in downtown Raytown, underwent two years of renovations from 1992–1994.  The most recent renovations were completed just before the 2008–2009 term, and included the addition of 2 science classrooms. The school currently has Missouri A+ designation, and is MSIP Accredited.

Notable alumni

Bobbi Johnson Kauffman, 1963 graduate; Miss USA 1964.
Roger Allen III, 2004 graduate; Football player, Guard for Tampa Bay Buccaneers
Bob Allison, 1952 graduate; 1959 American League Rookie of the Year with the Washington Senators
Gene Clark, an American singer-songwriter and founding member of the folk rock band the Byrds
 Jeff Cornell, Former MLB player (San Francisco Giants)
David F. Duncan, 1965 graduate; drug policy advisor to the Clinton White House
Tyronn Lue, 1995 graduate; former professional basketball player, Head coach with the Los Angeles Clippers
Dominique Morrison, 2008 graduate; college basketball player for Oral Roberts
Aldon Smith, NFL Player for Dallas Cowboys.

References

External links
Raytown C-2 School District

Educational institutions established in 1914
Schools in Jackson County, Missouri
High schools in Jackson County, Missouri
Public high schools in Missouri
1914 establishments in Missouri